The Horizontal Lieutenant is a 1962 American romantic comedy war film, based on the 1961 novel The Bottletop Affair by Gordon Cotler who was a Japanese interpreter for US Army Intelligence during World War II. It is a military comedy about an unfortunate army intelligence lieutenant who finds himself isolated on a remote island army outpost during World War II.  It stars Jim Hutton and Paula Prentiss and was directed by Richard Thorpe.

It was the last of four teamings between Hutton and Prentiss following Where the Boys Are, The Honeymoon Machine and Bachelor in Paradise.

Plot
2nd Lt. Merle Wye, an Army Intelligence officer stationed in Hawaii, is rendered horizontal when struck in the head by a foul ball while playing for his unit's baseball team. In the post hospital he is attracted to Lt. Molly Blue, a nurse he once knew in college. His superior (and manager of the team) orders the inept Merle to distant Rotohan, a Pacific island liberated from Japanese occupation some months before, ostensibly to relieve Lt. Billy Monk, who has been unable to capture a Japanese holdout called Kobayashi suspected of pilfering military supplies. However the coach really wants Monk, a former professional baseball player, for his team. By claiming to be ordered to dangerous duty Merle tries to seduce Blue; when she discovers the ruse, she barely gives him the time of day.

On Rotohan, Merle and his Nisei interpreter (and lothario) Sgt. Roy Tada team up with Monk to flush out the wily thief hiding in the hills. Using a reluctant Tada as a "spy" they discover that Kobayashi has been stealing the supplies, all creature comforts, to feed and clothe his pregnant girlfriend. But Merle is distracted when Blue is also assigned to his camp. With the Navy, in the form of obnoxious Cmdr. Jeremiah Hammerslag, also hunting Kobayashi, Merle is threatened by his new superior, Col. Korotny, with another transfer if he does not capture Kobayashi soon—this time to an even more remote rock with only six other soldiers as company.

While romancing a local girl, Akiko, Tada discovers that Kobayashi is not even a soldier but a former circus performer hidden in a cave in the hills by the villagers. That night Kobayashi is to appear at a variety show staged by the locals to entertain the Americans. When Merle tries to arrest him, the agile Kobayashi stuns him using judo, knocking him horizontal again, and escapes. Col. Korotny tells Merle he is shipping out in the morning. During a drive in the hills to "say goodbye", Merle and Blue stumble on the cave, where Blue captures the acrobat after Merle once more becomes "the horizontal lieutenant". Merle is given a medal anyway and wins her heart.

Cast
Jim Hutton as Lt. Merle Wye
Paula Prentiss as Lt. Molly Blue
Jack Carter as Lt. Billy Monk
Jim Backus as Cdr. Jeremiah Hammerslag
Charles McGraw as Col. Charles Korotny
Miyoshi Umeki as Akiko
Marty Ingels as Buckles
Lloyd Kino as Sgt. Jess Yomura
Linda Wong as Michido
Yoshio Yoda as Sgt. Roy Tada
Yuki Shimoda as Kobayashi

Production
The novel was published in 1959.

Hutton and Prentiss were under contract to MGM at the time.

It was known as The Bottle Cap Affair.

Reception
According to MGM records, the film earned $1.1 million in the US and Canada and $750,000 overseas, resulting in a loss of $380,000.

Comic book adaption
 Dell Movie Classic: The Horizontal Lieutenant (October 1962)

See also
 List of American films of 1962

References
Notes

External links
 
 
Original trailer at TCM

1962 films
1962 romantic comedy films
American romantic comedy films
1960s English-language films
Pacific War films
Military humor in film
Films based on American novels
Films set in Hawaii
Metro-Goldwyn-Mayer films
Films directed by Richard Thorpe
Films produced by Joe Pasternak
Films with screenplays by George Wells
Films set on islands
Films adapted into comics
Films about the United States Army
1960s American films